Hans Hjelle (17 March 1916 – 9 July 2008) was a Norwegian politician for the Liberal Party.

He served as a deputy representative to the Parliament of Norway from Møre og Romsdal during the terms 1958–1961 and 1961–1965. In total he met during 76 days of parliamentary session.

References

1916 births
2008 deaths
Liberal Party (Norway) politicians
Deputy members of the Storting